Anders Ohlsson is Swedish former footballer who played as a forward. He played 44 matches and scored four goals for Malmö FF between 1979 and 1983.

References

Association football forwards
Swedish footballers
Allsvenskan players
Malmö FF players
Living people
Year of birth missing (living people)